The Huntingdonshire Senior Cup is the second level football cup competition organised by the Huntingdonshire Football Association below the Huntingdonshire Premier Cup. The cup was first played for during the 1888–89 season, when it was won by St Neots.

Past finals

References

External links
Senior Cup Huntingdonshire FA

County Cup competitions
Football in Cambridgeshire
Recurring events established in 1888